Cheong Kuoc Vá (1956-) was the first Secretary for Security in Macau Special Administrative Region from 1999 to 2014.

Born in Macau, Cheong joined the Public Security Police Force of Macau upon graduation from Yuet Wah College in 1975. He became a deputy police sergeant in 1982 and, in 1989, section chief of Immigration Affairs, Immigration Bureau.

He furthered his education from 1991 to 1993 with advanced courses from the Security Forces of Macau.

Positions held:
 Deputy Chief of Police Department, 1993-1994
 Head of the Special Police Division of the Special Police Forces, 1994-1996
 Deputy Chief of the Police, 1995-1997
 Chief of the Police, 1997-1999
 Deputy Director for the Affairs of the Macau Security Forces
 Director for the Affairs of the Macau Security Forces

References
 Information on the major officials and the Procurator-General of the MSAR

1956 births
Living people
Macau people
Government ministers of Macau
Macau police officers